Mongba Hanba is a forest god in Meitei mythology and religion. He is mainly worshipped in a sacred forest named Mongba Hanba Umang in the banks of the Imphal River in Manipur.

History 
On Saturday, the 16th day of the Meitei lunar month of "Inga" of 1651 Saka Year (1729 AD), a stone was brought from a marketplace in Langmaiching to Mongba Hanba's place. That stone was to make a statue of Hindu God Hanuman. Nine Umang Lais were brought and gathered at the Mongba Hanba's place. All these were buried in the place during the reign of King Garib Niwaj Pamheiba. So, the cult of God Mongba Hanba was replaced by that of Hindu god Hanuman during the reign of King Garib Niwaj Pamheiba.

On 6 June 1979, an association was formed for saving Mongba Hanba Umang. It struggled for controlling the Laipham (English: Sacred place) for worshipping the traditional deity. There have been repeated attempts to revive the pantheon of the deity. However, there is still opposition from the religious body of the Mahabali Temple of Hindu God Hanuman.

During May 2015, an organization named Mongba Hanba Umang Laipham Kanba Lup appealed not to stop them from constructing a place of worship for God Mongba Hanba. The organization claimed that it had not stopped devotees of God Mahabali (Hanuman) for the last 36 years. The organization expected the same thing from the Hindu bodies not to stop them from establishing a place of worship for God Mongba Hanba in the complex.

Worship 
According to religious custom, Tampak Maiba was to worship God Mongba Hanba. The atmosphere of blood sacrifice is said to be associated with the shrine of the deity.

References

External links 

 
 Shimray, A. S. W. (2001). History of the Tangkhul Nagas. Akansha Publishing House. ISBN 978-81-87606-04-8.

Abundance deities
Abundance gods
Earth deities
Earth gods
Fortune deities
Fortune gods
Health deities
Health gods
Magic deities
Magic gods
Maintenance deities
Maintenance gods
Meitei deities
Names of God in Sanamahism
Nature deities
Nature gods
Ningthou
Peace deities
Peace gods
Time and fate deities
Time and fate gods
Tree deities
Tree gods
Tutelary deities
Tutelary gods
Wisdom deities
Wisdom gods